Geoffrey Lamont Holder (August 1, 1930 – October 5, 2014) was a Trinidadian-American actor, dancer, musician, and artist. He was a principal dancer for the Metropolitan Opera Ballet before his film career began in 1957 with an appearance in Carib Gold. In 1973, he played the villainous Baron Samedi in the Bond film Live and Let Die. He also carried out advertising work as the pitchman for 7 Up.

Early life 
Born in Port of Spain, Trinidad, Holder was one of four children of Bajan and Trinidadian descent. He was educated at Tranquility School and Queen's Royal College in Port of Spain. He made his performance debut at the age of seven in his brother Boscoe Holder's dance company.

Career 
After seeing him perform in St. Thomas, Virgin Islands the choreographer Agnes de Mille invited Holder to work with her in New York. Upon arriving he joined Katherine Dunham's dance school where he taught folkloric forms for two years.

From 1955 to 1956, he performed with the Metropolitan Opera Ballet as a principal dancer. He left the ballet to make his Broadway debut in the Harold Arlen and Truman Capote musical House of Flowers. While working on House of Flowers, Holder met Alvin Ailey, with whom he later worked extensively, and Carmen de Lavallade, his future wife. After the show closed he starred in an all-black production of Waiting for Godot in 1957.

Holder began his movie career in the 1962 British film All Night Long, a modern remake of Shakespeare's Othello. He followed that with Doctor Dolittle (1967) as Willie Shakespeare, leader of the natives of Sea-Star Island. In 1972, he was cast as the Sorcerer in Everything You Always Wanted to Know About Sex (But Were Afraid to Ask). The following year he was a henchman—Baron Samedi—in the Bond movie Live and Let Die. He contributed to the film's choreography.

In addition to his movie appearances, Holder was a spokesman in advertising campaigns for the soft drink 7 Up in the 1970s and 1980s, declaring it the "uncola", and, in the 1980s, calling it "crisp and clean, and no caffeine; never had it, never will".

In 1975, Holder won two Tony Awards for direction and costume design of The Wiz, the all-black musical version of The Wizard of Oz. Holder was the first black man to be nominated in either category. He won the Drama Desk Award for Outstanding Costume Design. The show ran for 1672 performances.

As a choreographer, Holder created dance pieces for many companies, including the Alvin Ailey American Dance Theater, for which he provided choreography, music, and costumes for Prodigal Prince (1967), and the Dance Theatre of Harlem, for which he provided choreography, music, and costumes for Dougla (1974), and designed costumes for Firebird (1982). In 1978, Holder directed and choreographed the Broadway musical Timbuktu! Holder's 1957 piece "Bele" is also part of the Dance Theater of Harlem repertory.

Holder portrayed Jupiter, the hulking manservant of an ill-fated treasure-hunter (Roberts Blossom), in a 1980 made-for-television adaptation of Edgar Allan Poe's The Gold Bug which also starred Anthony Michael Hall. In John Huston's 1982 film adaptation of the hit stage musical Annie, Holder played the role of Punjab, Albert Finney's bodyguard. Holder portrayed the Ghost of Christmas Future in John Grin's Christmas, a 1986 variation on Charles Dickens's A Christmas Carol directed by its star, Robert Guillaume. Holder portrayed Nelson in the 1992 film Boomerang with Eddie Murphy. He was also the voice of Ray in Bear in the Big Blue House and provided narration for Tim Burton's 2005 film version of Roald Dahl's Charlie and the Chocolate Factory. He reprised his role as the 7 Up spokesman in the 2011 season finale of The Celebrity Apprentice, where he appeared as himself in a commercial for "7 Up Retro" for Marlee Matlin's team.

In 1993 Holder did a series of commercials for the Armory Auto Group auto dealership in Albany, New York.

Holder was a prolific painter (patrons of his art included Lena Horne and William F. Buckley, Jr.), ardent art collector, book author, and music composer. As a painter, he won a Guggenheim Fellowship in fine arts in 1956. A book of his photography, Adam, was published by Viking Press in 1986.

Personal life 

Holder married Carmen de Lavallade in 1955. They spent their lives in New York City and had one son, Léo. They were the subject of a 2005 documentary, Carmen & Geoffrey. His elder brother Boscoe Holder was a dancer, choreographer, and artist. Boscoe's son Christian Holder has also won acclaim as a dancer, choreographer, and entertainer.

Death 
Holder died in Manhattan of complications from pneumonia on October 5, 2014, aged 84.

Productions

Broadway 
House of Flowers, Original Musical, 1954 – Banda dance choreography, performer
Josephine Baker, musical review, 1954 – Performer
Waiting for Godot, revival (all black cast), 1957 – Performer
The Wiz, original musical, 1975 – Direction, costume design (Tony Award for Best Costume Design and Best Direction of a Musical, 1975)
Timbuktu!, original musical, 1978  – Direction, choreography, costume design, playbill cover illustration
The Wiz, revival, 1984 – Direction, costume design
The Boys' Choir of Harlem and Friends, staged concert, 1993 – Staging

Radio 
KYOT-FM in Phoenix, Arizona, 1994–2011 – Voiceover

Filmography

References

Bibliography

External links 
 
 
 
Geoffrey Holder's oral history video excerpts at The National Visionary Leadership Project
 Leo Holder, "'This Impromptu Dance': Geoffrey Holder's Son Tells One More Story", NPR, October 29, 2014.
Stuart A. Rose Manuscript, Archives, and Rare Book Library, Emory University: Geoffrey Holder and Carmen De Lavallade papers, circa 1900–2018

1930 births
2014 deaths
American people of Barbadian descent
American male film actors
American male musical theatre actors
American male stage actors
American male dancers
American male television actors
American male voice actors
Deaths from pneumonia in New York City
Drama Desk Award winners
People from Port of Spain
People from New York (state)
Tony Award winners
Trinidad and Tobago dancers
Trinidad and Tobago choreographers
Trinidad and Tobago emigrants to the United States
Trinidad and Tobago male film actors
Trinidad and Tobago male stage actors
Trinidad and Tobago male television actors
Trinidad and Tobago people of Barbadian descent
20th-century Trinidad and Tobago male actors
21st-century Trinidad and Tobago male actors
Alumni of Queen's Royal College, Trinidad
African-American choreographers
American choreographers
20th-century African-American people
21st-century African-American people
21st-century Trinidad and Tobago actors
20th-century Trinidad and Tobago actors